Seattle Sounders FC was a professional beach soccer team based in United States. They were affiliated with Seattle Sounders FC, a Major League Soccer team, and competed in the 2011 and 2012 Mundialito de Clubes, an international beach soccer competition for clubs. Brazilian manager Marcelo Mendes was the head coach for the team at both tournaments; the rosters were formed from a special draft held in São Paulo.

Mundialito de Clubes 2012 squad

Coach: Marcelo Mendes

Honous

International competitions
Mundialito de Clubes
 Group Stage: 2012
 Quarter Final: 2011

References

Beach soccer clubs
Seattle Sounders FC